
Because of the large number of universities and colleges in the United States, and in some cases because of their lengthy formal names, it is common to abbreviate their names in everyday usage. The type of institution, such as "University" or "College," may be dropped, or some component of it abbreviated, such as "Tech" in place of "Institute of Technology" or "Technological University."

The same nickname may apply to multiple institutions, especially in different regions—e.g., "SC" is claimed by both the University of Southern California and the University of South Carolina. The abbreviation may be non-obvious—e.g., "KU" is the University of Kansas and not "UK," which is commonly the University of Kentucky. In some cases, the nickname may be better known than the formal name—e.g., "West Point" for the United States Military Academy.

This list of colloquial names for universities and colleges in the United States provides a lexicon of such names. It includes only alternative names for institutions, not nicknames for their campuses, athletic teams or personalities. Thus it specifically excludes mascots and athletic team names, for which see List of U.S. college team nicknames and List of U.S. college mascots.

A
 AECOM – Albert Einstein College of Medicine
 AFA – United States Air Force Academy
 AFIT – Air Force Institute of Technology
 Annapolis – U.S. Naval Academy
 A&M – Texas A&M University, but also others; see A&M
 A&M-CC or A&M-Corpus Christi – Texas A&M University–Corpus Christi
 A&T – North Carolina A&T State University
 APSU – Austin Peay State University
 ALASU – Alabama State University
 Army – U.S. Military Academy
 ASU – Alabama State University, Albany State University, Alcorn State University, Angelo State University, Appalachian State University, Arizona State University, Arkansas State University, Augusta State University, Armstrong State University
 APU – Alaska Pacific University
 AU – Adelphi University, Alfred University, American University, Anderson University, Asbury University, Auburn University, Ashford University, Arcadia University, Augusta University
 AUM – Auburn University Montgomery
 App State – Appalachian State University

B
 Bama – University of Alabama
 BC – Boston College, Bethel College
 BCC - Bronx Community College
 Berkeley – University of California, Berkeley
 BGSU – Bowling Green State University
 BHSU – Black Hills State University
 BJU – Bob Jones University
 BMC – Bryn Mawr College
 Bona – St. Bonaventure University
 Brown – Brown University
 BSC – Birmingham-Southern College
 BSU – Ball State University, Boise State University, Bemidji State University, Bowie State University
 BW –  Baldwin Wallace University
 BU –  Barry University Baylor University, Belmont University, Binghamton University, Biola University, Boston University, Bradley University, Butler University, Bucknell University
 BYU – Brigham Young University

C
 CBU – California Baptist University
 C of C – College of Charleston
 Cal – University of California, Berkeley
 Cal Poly – California Polytechnic State University, San Luis Obispo
 Cal Poly Pomona – California State Polytechnic University, Pomona
 Caltech – California Institute of Technology
 Cal State – California State University (various campuses)
 Carolina – University of North Carolina at Chapel Hill, University of South Carolina
 Catholic – Catholic University of America
 Central – Central State University, North Carolina Central University
 CC – Colorado College
 CCNY – City College of New York
 CCSU – Central Connecticut State University
 CCU – Coastal Carolina University
 CCV – Community College of Vermont
 CGU – Claremont Graduate University
 Chapel Hill – University of North Carolina at Chapel Hill
 Charlotte – University of North Carolina at Charlotte
 Chatt or Chattanooga – University of Tennessee at Chattanooga
 Chatt State – Chattanooga State Community College
 Chico State – California State University, Chico
 City Tech – New York City College of Technology
 CIA – The Culinary Institute of America
 CMC – Claremont McKenna College
 CMU – Carnegie Mellon University, Central Michigan University
 CNU – Christopher Newport University
 Coast Guard – United States Coast Guard Academy
 College Park – University of Maryland, College Park
 Colorado – University of Colorado Boulder
 Colorado Springs – University of Colorado Colorado Springs
 Conn – Connecticut College
 CSB/SJU – College of Saint Benedict/Saint John's University
 CSE – College of Saint Elizabeth
 CSI – College of Staten Island
 CSU – California State University, Cleveland State University, Colorado State University, Clayton State University, Coppin State University, Clark Summit University, Chicago State University 
 CSUF – California State University, Fresno
 CSUEB – California State University, East Bay (formerly California State University, Hayward)
 CSULA – California State University, Los Angeles
 CSULB – California State University, Long Beach
 CSU-Pueblo – Colorado State University-Pueblo
 CSUS – California State University, Sacramento
 CU – Chapman University, Clemson University, University of Colorado at Boulder, University of Colorado system, Columbia University, Concord University, Cornell University, Creighton University
 CUA – Catholic University of America
 Cumberlands – University of the Cumberlands
 CUNY – City University of New York
 'Cuse – Syracuse University
 CWRU – Case Western Reserve University
 CWU – Central Washington University

D
 DBU – Daybreak University
 DC – Dartmouth College, Davidson College
 De Anza – De Anza College
 DPU – DePaul University
 DSU – DeSales University, Delta State University, Dakota State University
 DU – Denison University, University of Denver, Drake University, Drexel University, Duke University, Duquesne University
 Duke – Duke University

E
 ECU – East Carolina University
 EIU – Eastern Illinois University
 EMU – Eastern Mennonite University
 EMU – Eastern Michigan University
 ENC – Eastern Nazarene College
 ETBU - East Texas Baptist University
 ETSU – East Tennessee State University
 EWU – Eastern Washington University
 EKU – Eastern Kentucky University

F
 F&M – Franklin & Marshall College
 FAMU – Florida A&M University
 FAU – Florida Atlantic University
 FDU – Fairleigh Dickinson University
 FGCU – Florida Gulf Coast University
FIT – Fashion Institute of Technology
Florida Tech – Florida Institute of Technology
 FIU – Florida International University
 Foothill – Foothill College
 FPU – Fresno Pacific University
 Fresno State – California State University, Fresno
 FSU – Fayetteville State University, Ferris State University, Fitchburg State University, Florida State University, Framingham State University, California State University, Fresno, Frostburg State University
 FU – Fordham University, Furman University

G
 GAC - Gustavus Adolphus College
 GB – University of Wisconsin–Green Bay
 GC&SU or GCSU – Georgia College & State University
 GCU – Grand Canyon University
 Georgia College – Georgia College & State University
George Mason or GMU — George Mason University
 Georgia Tech – Georgia Institute of Technology
George Washington, GW, or GWU – George Washington University
 GGC – Georgia Gwinnett College
 GONZ – Gonzaga University
 GSU – Georgia Southern University, Georgia State University, Grambling State University
 GT – Georgia Institute of Technology
 GVSU – Grand Valley State University
GW or GWU – Gardner-Webb University
 GU - Georgetown University, Gallaudet University, Gonzaga University

H
 HC - Haverford College
 HIU – Hampton University (formerly Hampton Institute)
 HMC – Harvey Mudd College
 Hopkins – Johns Hopkins University
 HU – Howard University
 HU – Hampton University
 HSC or H-SC - Hampden Sydney College
 HSU – Humboldt State University, Hardin-Simmons University

I
 IC – Ithaca College
 IIT – Illinois Institute of Technology
 IPFW – Indiana University-Purdue University Fort Wayne
 ISU – Idaho State University, Illinois State University, Indiana State University, Iowa State University
 IU or IUB – Indiana University Bloomington
 IUP – Indiana University of Pennsylvania
 IUPUI – Indiana University-Purdue University Indianapolis
 IWU – Illinois Wesleyan University
 IW – Iowa Wesleyan University

J
 JBU - John Brown University
 JHU – Johns Hopkins University
 JMU – James Madison University
 JWU – Johnson and Wales University
 JSU – Jackson State University, Jacksonville State University
 JU – Jacksonville University
 Jax st or J'ville st – Jacksonville State University

K
 K-State – Kansas State University, Kentucky State University
 KSU – Kansas State University, Kennesaw State University, Kent State University, Kentucky State University
 KU – University of Kansas, Kutztown University of Pennsylvania
 KYSU – Kentucky State University

L
 LA Tech – Louisiana Tech University
 LC – Louisburg College
 LETU - LeTourneau University
 LHU – Lock Haven University
 LIU – Long Island University
 LMU – Lincoln Memorial University, Loyola Marymount University
 Long Beach State – California State University, Long Beach
 LSU – La Salle University, Louisiana State University
 LSSU – Lake Superior State University
 LTU – Lawrence Technological University, Lawrence Tech
 LU – Liberty University, Lipscomb University, Lehigh University
 LUC – Loyola University Chicago

M
 Madison – James Madison University, University of Wisconsin–Madison
 Maryland – University of Maryland, College Park
 Mary Wash – University of Mary Washington
 Mason – George Mason University
 MCLA – Massachusetts College of Liberal Arts
 Memphis – University of Memphis
 Merchant Marine, Kings Point – U.S. Merchant Marine Academy
 Metro State – Metropolitan State College of Denver
 MHC or MoHo – Mount Holyoke College
 Midd – Middlebury College
 Milwaukee – University of Wisconsin–Milwaukee
 Missouri S&T – Missouri University of Science and Technology
 MIT – Massachusetts Institute of Technology
 Mizzou – University of Missouri
 MMC – Marymount Manhattan College
 Mt. SAC – Mt. San Antonio College
 MSU – Michigan State University, Mississippi State University, Missouri State University, Morehead State University, Murray State University, Montana State University, Montclair State University, Mountain State University, Morgan State University, University of Missouri (antiquated)
 MTSU – Middle Tennessee State University
 MTU – Michigan Technological University
 MU – Miami University, Marymount University, University of Missouri, Misericordia University, Millersville University, Mercyhurst University
 Mudd – Harvey Mudd College
 MVille – Manhattanville College
 MVSU – Mississippi Valley State University
 MUW – Mississippi University for Women

N
 Navy – U.S. Naval Academy
 NAU – Northern Arizona University, National American University
 NCCU – North Carolina Central University
 NCSU – North Carolina State University
 NC A&T – North Carolina A&T State University
 ND – University of North Dakota, University of Notre Dame
 NDSU – North Dakota State University
 NEU – Northeastern University
 New College or NCF – New College of Florida
 Newport News – Apprentice School
 NIU – Northern Illinois University
 NJIT - New Jersey Institute of Technology
 NKU – Northern Kentucky University
 NMSU – New Mexico State University
 NMU – Northern Michigan University
 NoDak – University of North Dakota
 Nova – Northern Virginia Community College, Villanova University
 NSU – Norfolk State University, Northern State University (South Dakota), Northeastern State University (Oklahoma), Northwestern State University (Louisiana), Nova Southeastern University
 NU – Northeastern University, University of Nebraska–Lincoln, Niagara University, Northwestern University, Norwich University
 NVU – Northern Vermont University
 NW – Northwestern University, technically incorrect
 NWMSU – Northwest Missouri State University
 NYIT – New York Institute of Technology; New York Tech
 NYMC – New York Medical College
 NYU – New York University

O
 OC – Oklahoma Christian University
 OCC – Orange Coast College
 OCU – Oklahoma City University
 ODU – Ohio Dominican University, Old Dominion University
 OIT – Oregon Institute of Technology
 OK State – Oklahoma State University
 Ole Miss – University of Mississippi
 ONU – Ohio Northern University
 ORU – Oral Roberts University
 OSU – Ohio State University, Oklahoma State University, Oregon State University
 OU – Oakland University, Ohio University, University of Oklahoma, Oakwood University
 Oxy – Occidental College

P
 Pacific – University of the Pacific
 PC – Providence College
 PCC – Pasadena City College, Pensacola Christian College, Pima Community College, Polk Community College, Portland Community College, Pueblo Community College
 Penn – University of Pennsylvania
 Penn State – Pennsylvania State University
 PennWest California - Pennsylvania Western University, California
 Pitt – University of Pittsburgh
 PLNU – Point Loma Nazarene University
 POM – Pomona College
 PSU – Pennsylvania State University, Pittsburg State University, Portland State University, Plymouth State University
 PTS – Princeton Theological Seminary
 PVAMU – Prairie View A&M University

Q
 QC - Queens College, Quincy College
 QU – Quincy University, Quinnipiac University

R
 RHIT – Rose-Hulman Institute of Technology
 RIC – Rhode Island College
 RISD – Rhode Island School of Design
 RIT – Rochester Institute of Technology 
 RMU – Robert Morris University
 R-MWC – Randolph-Macon Woman's College
 RPI – Rensselaer Polytechnic Institute
 RU – Rutgers University
 RWU – Roger Williams University

S
 Sacramento State / Sac State – California State University, Sacramento
 SBU – St. Bonaventure University
 SC – University of Southern California, University of South Carolina
 SCSU – South Carolina State University, Southern Connecticut State University
 Scripps – Scripps College, Scripps Institution of Oceanography
 SCU – Santa Clara University
 SDSM&T – South Dakota School of Mines and Technology
 SDSU – South Dakota State University, San Diego State University
 SeattleU - Seattle University
 SEMo – Southeast Missouri State University
 Sewanee – University of the South
 SFSU – San Francisco State University
 SHC – Spring Hill College
 SIU or SIUC – Southern Illinois University Carbondale
 SIUE – Southern Illinois University Edwardsville
 SJC – St. John's College
 SJFC – St. John Fisher College
 SJSU – San Jose State University
 SJU – Saint Joseph's University, St. John's University (NY)
 SLU – Saint Louis University, St. Lawrence University, Saint Leo University
 SMC – St. Mary's College (CA)
 SMU – Southern Methodist University
 SNHU – Southern New Hampshire University
 SOSU – Southeastern Oklahoma State University
 SPU – Seattle Pacific University
 SRU – Slippery Rock University of Pennsylvania
 Stanislaus State or Stan State – California State University, Stanislaus
 SSU – Savannah State University, California State University, Sonoma
 State – any of various state universities
 SU – Southwestern University, Shenandoah University, Southern University, Susquehanna University, Syracuse University, Salisbury University, Samford University, Schreiner University
 SUI – State University of Iowa
 SUU – Southern Utah University
 SUNY – State University of New York system
Swat – Swarthmore College
 SWOSU – Southwestern Oklahoma State University

T
 TAMU – Texas A&M University
 TAMUCC – Texas A&M University–Corpus Christi
 TCNJ – The College of New Jersey
 TCU – Texas Christian University
 Tech – any "Institute of Technology," "Tech University," "Polytechnic," etc. (See list of institutions using the term "institute of technology" or "polytechnic")
 Transy – Transylvania University
 TSU – Tarleton State University, Tennessee State University, Texas Southern University, Truman State University
 TTU – Texas Tech University, Tennessee Technological University
 TU – Temple University, Towson University, Tufts University, Tulane University, Tuskegee University, University of Tulsa
 TxSt – Texas State University–San Marcos

U
 The U – University of Miami, University of Minnesota, University of Utah
 U of A – University of Arizona, University of Arkansas
 U of U – University of Utah
 UA – University of Akron, University of Alabama, University of Arizona
 UAA – University of Alaska Anchorage
 UAB – University of Alabama at Birmingham
 UAF – University of Alaska Fairbanks
 UAH – University of Alabama in Huntsville
 UALR – University of Arkansas at Little Rock
 UAM – University of Arkansas at Monticello
 UAPB – University of Arkansas at Pine Bluff
 UB – University of Baltimore, University at Buffalo, University of Bridgeport
 UChicago or U of C – University of Chicago
 UC – University of California system, University of Chicago, University of Cincinnati, University of the Cumberlands
 UCB – University of Colorado Boulder
 UC Berkeley – University of California, Berkeley
 UC Davis – University of California, Davis
 UC Irvine – University of California, Irvine
 UCA – University of Central Arkansas
 UCCS – University of Colorado Colorado Springs
 UCD – University of California, Davis, University of Colorado Denver
 UCF – University of Central Florida (was Florida Tech)
 UCI – University of California, Irvine
 UCLA – University of California, Los Angeles
 UCM – University of Central Missouri
 UCO – University of Central Oklahoma
 UConn – University of Connecticut
 UCR – University of California, Riverside
 UCSB – University of California, Santa Barbara
 UCSD – University of California, San Diego
 UCSF – University of California, San Francisco
 UD – University of Dallas, University of Dayton, University of Delaware
 UDM – University of Detroit Mercy
 UDC – University of the District of Columbia
 U Dub – University of Washington
 UF – University of Florida
 UGA – University of Georgia
 UH – University of Hawaiʻi at Mānoa, University of Hawaii system, University of Houston
 U of H – University of Houston
 UHCL – University of Houston–Clear Lake
 UHD – University of Houston–Downtown
 UHS – University of Houston System
 UHV – University of Houston–Victoria
 UI or U of I – University of Idaho, University of Illinois at Urbana–Champaign, University of Iowa
 UIC – University of Illinois at Chicago
 UIUC – University of Illinois at Urbana–Champaign
 UK – University of Kentucky
 ULM – University of Louisiana at Monroe
 UL – University of Louisiana (at Lafayette)
 U of L – University of Louisville
 U of M – University of Memphis, University of Miami, University of Michigan, University of Minnesota, Twin Cities, University of Montana
 UMass – University of Massachusetts Amherst
 UMB – University of Maryland, Baltimore, University of Massachusetts Boston
 UMBC – University of Maryland, Baltimore County
 UMC – University of Missouri–Columbia
 UMD – University of Maryland, College Park, University of Massachusetts Dartmouth, University of Michigan–Dearborn, or University of Minnesota Duluth
UMGC – University of Maryland Global Campus
 UMich – University of Michigan
 UMKC – University of Missouri–Kansas City
 UML – University of Massachusetts Lowell
 UMO – University of Maine at Orono
 UMW – University of Mary Washington
 UNA – University of North Alabama
 UNC – University of North Carolina at Chapel Hill, University of Northern Colorado
 UNCC – University of North Carolina at Charlotte
 UNCG – University of North Carolina at Greensboro
 UNCW – University of North Carolina at Wilmington
 UND – University of North Dakota
 UNF – University of North Florida
 UNH – University of New Hampshire, University of New Haven
 UNI – University of Northern Iowa (was Iowa Teachers)
 Union – Union College
 UNK – University of Nebraska at Kearney
 UNL – University of Nebraska–Lincoln
 UNLV – University of Nevada, Las Vegas (formerly Nevada Southern)
 UNM – University of New Mexico
 UNO – University of Nebraska at Omaha, University of New Orleans
 UNR – University of Nevada, Reno
 UNT – University of North Texas
 UO – University of Oregon
 UOP – University of the Pacific
 UoPeople - University of the People
 UP – University of Portland
 UPenn – University of Pennsylvania
 UPIKE – University of Pikeville
 UR or U of R – University of Richmond, University of Rochester
 URI – University of Rhode Island
 U of S – University of Scranton
 USA – University of South Alabama
 USAFA – United States Air Force Academy
 USAO – University of Science and Arts of Oklahoma
 USC – University of Southern California, University of South Carolina
 USCA – University of South Carolina Aiken
 USD – University of San Diego, University of South Dakota
 USF – University of San Francisco, University of South Florida
 USFCA – University of San Francisco
 USI – University of Southern Indiana
 USM – University of Southern Maine, The University of Southern Mississippi
 USU – Utah State University
 UT – University of Tampa, University of Tennessee, University of Texas at Austin, University of Toledo
 UTA – University of Texas at Arlington
 Utah – University of Utah
 UTB/TSC – University of Texas at Brownsville and Texas Southmost College
 UTC – University of Tennessee at Chattanooga
 UTD – University of Texas at Dallas
 UTEP – University of Texas at El Paso (was Texas Western)
 UTHSCT - University of Texas Health Science Center at Tyler
 UTM – University of Tennessee at Martin
 UTPB – University of Texas Permian Basin
 UTRGV – University of Texas Rio Grande Valley
 UTSA – University of Texas at San Antonio
 UVA – University of Virginia
 UVM – University of Vermont
 UVU – Utah Valley University
 UW – University of Washington, University of Wisconsin System, University of Wisconsin–Madison, University of Wyoming
 UWF – University of West Florida
 UWG – University of West Georgia
 UWGB – University of Wisconsin–Green Bay
 UWM – University of Wisconsin–Milwaukee

V
 Valpo – Valparaiso University
 Vandy – Vanderbilt University
 VCU – Virginia Commonwealth University
 Virginia Tech – Virginia Polytechnic Institute and State University
 VMI – Virginia Military Institute
 VPI – Virginia Polytechnic Institute and State University (An abbreviation of the university official name, though not actively used by the university)
 VSU – Valdosta State University, Virginia State University
 VT or VPI – Virginia Polytechnic Institute and State University
 VTC – Vermont Technical College
 VU – Valparaiso University, Vanderbilt University, Villanova University, Vincennes University, Vanguard University

W
 Washington University – Washington University in St. Louis
 WCU - Western Colorado University
 W&J – Washington & Jefferson College
 W&L – Washington and Lee University
 W&M – The College of William & Mary
 WashU or Wash U – Washington University in St. Louis
 Wazzu or WSU– Washington State University
 WC – Wagner College, Wilmington College
 WCU – Western Carolina University, West Chester University
 West Point – U.S. Military Academy
 Western – Western Washington University
 WFU – Wake Forest University
WGU – Western Governors University
 Williams – Williams College
 WIU – Western Illinois University
 WKU – Western Kentucky University
 WMU – Western Michigan University
 WPI – Worcester Polytechnic Institute
 WSU – Washington State University, Wichita State University, Wright State University
 WSSU - Winston-Salem State University
 WTAMU – West Texas A&M University
 WU - Washburn University, Washington University, Winthrop University
 WUSTL – Washington University in St. Louis
 WVU – West Virginia University
 WVUP – West Virginia University at Parkersburg (WVU Parkersburg)
 WWC - Warren Wilson College
 WWU – Western Washington University

X
 XU – Xavier University (Cincinnati)
 XULA – Xavier University of Louisiana

Y
 The Y – Brigham Young University
 YSU – Youngstown State University
 YU – Yeshiva University

References

Universities and colleges
Colloquial names for universities and colleges in the United States
Colloquial terms